Masoandro is a monotypic moth genus in the subfamily Lymantriinae erected by Paul Griveaud in 1976. Its only species, Masoandro peculiaris, was first described by Arthur Gardiner Butler in 1879. It is found on Madagascar.

References

Lymantriinae
Monotypic moth genera